The Handball events at the 1986 Asian Games were held in South Korea between September 23 and September 28, 1986. The competition included only men's event.

South Korea won the gold medal in a round robin competition, China finished second and won the silver medal while Japan won the bronze medal after beating Kuwait, Iran and Hong Kong.

Medalists

Results

Final standing

References
 Results

External links
 Asian Handball Federation

 
1986 Asian Games events
1986
Asian Games
1986 Asian Games